Mpenjani ‘Mpe’ Mwaruwari (born 13 August 1978), often known simply as Benjani, is a Zimbabwean retired professional footballer who played as a striker.

Having started his career with Jomo Cosmos, Benjani moved to Europe in 2001 to join Swiss side Grasshopper Club Zürich before moving to Auxerre a year later. He signed with Premier League club Portsmouth in 2006, then went on to play in England's top flight for Manchester City, Sunderland and Blackburn Rovers before returning to Portsmouth in 2011. The following year, he returned to South Africa with Chippa United and then Bidvest Wits.

Benjani played a total 31 times for the Zimbabwe national team and was its captain for many of those matches. A member of the squad at the 2006 Africa Cup of Nations, he retired from international football in October 2010 to concentrate on his club career. He is the assistant coach of the Zimbabwe national football team and Head Coach of Ngezi Platinum FC.

Club career

Early career
Benjani began his career at Lulu Rovers, Highlanders FC Juniors, Zimba Africa Rivers, University of Zimbabwe teams in Zimbabwe's Division one and Air Zimbabwe Jets in the country's Premier League in 1999. He moved to South African club Jomo Cosmos in 1999 where he met his mentor Jomo Sono, after impressing in the friendly match between South Africa and Zimbabwe that was played to commemorate the inauguration of Thabo Mbeki as the president of South Africa..

In 2001, he was voted PSL Player of the Season and PSL Players' Player of the Season in South Africa.

Grasshopper and Auxerre
Benjani moved to Swiss club Grasshopper Club Zürich on loan in 2001. In 2002, Guy Roux took him to Auxerre of France. Benjani had a good run at the start, capitalising from Djibril Cissé's absence, becoming top goalscorer in Ligue 1. Roux never played the two together, and eventually Benjani found himself surplus to requirements under Roux's successor, Jacques Santini, this time forced out of the 4–5–1 formation by Luigi Pieroni. While at Auxerre, Benjani scored the opening goal in the 2005 Coupe de France final as they defeated Paris St Germain. He also played as a substitute in the final as they won the tournament two years earlier in 2003. On 5 January 2006, English Premier League club Portsmouth signed him from Auxerre for £4.1 million after Arsenal manager Arsène Wenger recommended the player to Harry Redknapp.

This transfer from Auxerre to Portsmouth in January 2006 is one of those about which the Stevens inquiry report in June 2007 expressed concerns:

"Agent Willie McKay acted for the selling club, Auxerre, in the transfer of Benjani and, for the same reason as above" (still awaiting clarification) "the inquiry is not prepared to clear these transfers at this stage."

"In relation to Benjani's transfer, the enquiry also has identified concerns regarding the role of (agent) Teni Yerima and (third party) Ralph N'Komo."

Portsmouth
Benjani failed to score in his first fourteen games for the club, but became a crowd favourite because of his high workrate and assists for other players. Benjani finally got his first goal for Portsmouth against Wigan Athletic on 29 April 2006 in a 2–1 victory which saw Portsmouth avoid relegation from the Premier League. On 29 September 2007, Benjani scored three goals for Portsmouth in a 7–4 win over Reading, which broke the record for the most goals scored in a Premier League match. After Portsmouth's visit to Wigan on 20 October, Benjani became the Premier League's top scorer.

Portsmouth boss Harry Redknapp banned Benjani from taking any further penalties after he missed a spot-kick in second-half injury time in a home game against West Ham United. He then made amends for his miss scoring in the 4–1 victory over Newcastle United to bring his total to eight for the season. He then scored his ninth of the season, albeit a consolation goal in a 4–1 defeat at Liverpool. On 19 January 2008, Benjani earned his second Portsmouth hat-trick, scoring all of his side's goals in a 3–1 victory over Derby County at Fratton Park. This took his tally for the season to 12 and subsequently resulted in him revising his target for the season, which had been 10.

Benjani's goalscoring form during the first half of the 2007–08 season cemented Manchester City manager Sven-Göran Eriksson's interest in the striker, and on 31 January 2008 he had a bid of around £7.6 million accepted for the transfer of the player. However, it was revealed that Benjani had missed two successive planes to Manchester, meaning he did not arrive at the club's training ground until 11:10 pm, leaving insufficient time to complete a move before the midnight deadline. Portsmouth had already confirmed the signing of Benjani's replacement, Jermain Defoe from Tottenham Hotspur.

Manchester City
A transfer was completed for Benjani to move to Manchester City on 5 February 2008 for a fee of £3.87 million on a two-and-a-half-year deal. Further payments could be made if the player makes up to 75 senior starts which would raise the fee to a total of £7.6 million. His wage was reported at £50,000 a week His debut came on 10 February 2008 against rivals Manchester United in a 2–1 victory to City. He scored the second goal from a header in his first Manchester derby. His first goal at the City of Manchester Stadium was against his former club Portsmouth on 20 April 2008, although Benjani refused to celebrate after the goal out of respect for his former club, stating in a post match interview that he would never celebrate a goal against Portsmouth because the club and its fans had been so good to him. His next goal came in the 3–2 home loss against Fulham.

After a lengthy thigh injury, Benjani made a goal scoring return for the reserves, before following this up days later by making an impact as a second half substitute, scoring what would be the winning goal in City's 3–2 win over Twente. He scored again in the UEFA Cup with an away goal against Schalke 04. His former club Portsmouth were fined £15,000 for his transfer to and from the club, after they were found to have breached transfer rules.

Benjani entered talks with Hull City over a transfer to the club in August 2009, but negotiations ended after he failed to agree personal terms. He was also linked with a return to former club Portsmouth as well as West Ham and Stoke City of the Premier League and League Two club Notts County.

Under new Manchester City manager Roberto Mancini, Benjani started his first game of the 2009–10 season in a third round FA Cup tie away to Middlesbrough on 2 January 2010, during which he scored the only goal just before half-time in a 1–0 win.

On 8 June 2010, it was announced that Benjani's contract had expired and that he would be leaving the club, along with Sylvinho, Karl Moore and Martin Petrov.

On 2 February 2010, Benjani moved to Sunderland on loan until the end of the season, after the Premier League confirmed that the paperwork had been completed before the transfer deadline. On 18 May 2010, Steve Bruce confirmed that Benjani would not be offered a permanent deal.

Blackburn Rovers
After a month of being a free agent and considering his options, it was revealed that Benjani was training with Premier League team Blackburn Rovers in the hopes of earning a deal with the club. On 27 August, he signed a one-year deal with Blackburn, with an option of a further year at Ewood Park. He made his debut in a 1–1 draw against Fulham at Ewood Park on 18 September, replacing Nikola Kalinić in the 65th minute of the game. He made his first start for Blackburn against Aston Villa in the third round of the League Cup, at Villa Park on 22 September. He scored the first goal, a glancing header, in Blackburn's home game to Chelsea, on 30 October in the 21st minute, in a 2–1 defeat playing 46 minutes and being substituted by fellow striker Jason Roberts. He made his 10th appearance for the club as a substitute against West Ham in a 1–1 draw on 18 December. Also against West Ham he miss kicked a clear shooting opportunity which fell to captain and New Zealand skipper Ryan Nelsen who also sliced it but in the end he scored with the ball deflecting in off his thigh. On 5 January 2011, he scored two goals against Liverpool in a 3–1 win at Ewood Park.

On 21 July 2011, Benjani declined the new contract terms offered to him by Rovers and left the club. In August 2011, he began training with Conference National side Stockport County who were managed by Benjani's former Manchester City teammate Dietmar Hamann.

Return to Portsmouth
On 13 August 2011 (his 33rd birthday), it was announced that Benjani had re-signed for Portsmouth. He was unveiled to the crowd at Fratton Park before the Championship clash against Brighton & Hove Albion after signing a one-year deal. His first match was against Reading on 16 August 2011 as a 75th-minute substitute. He scored his first goal in his second spell for Portsmouth in a 3–2 defeat at home to Peterborough United on 27 September 2011. Benjani, however, played less under manager Michael Appleton and could not produce his form like he did in his previous spell at Portsmouth. After a poor season, Benjani was not offered a new contract and was subsequently released. After his release, Benjani wrote a goodbye message to Portsmouth fans, saying:

Later career
On 1 October 2012, it was announced that Benjani had joined Supersport United on a one-year deal. The deal later collapsed.

On 27 February 2013, it was announced that Benjani had joined Chippa United on a deal until the end of the season. Chippa United Head of Communication, Lukanyo Mzinzi confirmed that Benjani would move to Chippa, and revealed they have the option to renew Benjani's contract, that expires at the end of the current season. He made his debut on 6 March 2013 against Kaizer Chiefs. In 2020, he was the coach for Evercreech Rovers in the Mid-Somerset football league.

International career
Benjani is a former captain of the Zimbabwe national team, having taken the armband from former Coventry City, Birmingham, Sheffield United and Huddersfield Striker Peter Ndlovu when he retired from international football after the 2006 African Cup of Nations. He is the third Zimbabwean to play in the Premier League after goalkeeper Bruce Grobbelaar, who played for Liverpool, and Peter Ndlovu, who played for Coventry City and Sheffield United amongst others.

During the run up to the 2006 African Cup of Nations, Benjani provided the funding for the senior national team's stay in France when they were preparing for the competition.

Benjani retired from international football on 11 October 2010, following Zimbabwe's 0–0 draw with Cape Verde. He gained 24 international caps, scoring four goals.

Career statistics

Club

International

Honours
Auxerre
Coupe de France: 2002–03, 2004–05

References

External links

1978 births
Living people
Sportspeople from Bulawayo
Zimbabwean footballers
Zimbabwe international footballers
2006 Africa Cup of Nations players
Zimbabwean expatriates in South Africa
Zimbabwean expatriate sportspeople in Switzerland
Zimbabwean expatriates in France
Zimbabwean expatriates in England
Expatriate footballers in Switzerland
Expatriate footballers in France
Expatriate footballers in England
Expatriate soccer players in South Africa
Association football forwards
Jomo Cosmos F.C. players
Grasshopper Club Zürich players
AJ Auxerre players
Portsmouth F.C. players
Manchester City F.C. players
Sunderland A.F.C. players
Blackburn Rovers F.C. players
Swiss Super League players
Ligue 1 players
Premier League players
English Football League players
Chippa United F.C. players
Bidvest Wits F.C. players
South African Premier Division players